In the broadest sense of the word, a vocable is any meaningful sound uttered by people, such as a word or term, that is fixed by their language and culture.  Use of the words in the broad sense is archaic and the term is instead used for utterances which are not considered words, such as the English vocables of assent and denial, uh-huh  and uh-uh , or the vocable of error, uh-oh . 

Such non-lexical vocables are often used in music, for example la la la or dum dee dum, or in magical incantations, such as abra-cadabra.  Many Native American songs consist entirely of vocables; this may be due to both phonetic substitution to increase the resonance of the song, and to the trade of songs between nations speaking different languages. Jewish Nigunim also feature wordless melodies composed entirely of vocables such as Yai nai nai or Yai dai dai.  

Vocables are common as pause fillers, such as um and er in English, where they have little formal meaning and are rarely purposeful.  

Pseudowords that mimic the structure of real words are used in experiments in psycholinguistics and cognitive psychology, for example the nonsense syllables introduced by Hermann Ebbinghaus.

The proto-words of infants, which are meaningful but do not correspond to words of adult speech, are also sometimes called vocables.

See also
 Non-lexical vocables in music
 Speech disfluency
 Onomatopoeia

References

Oral communication
Singing